The Hellenic Air Accident Investigation and Aviation Safety Board (AAIASB, ΕΔΑΑΠ) is the air accident investigation agency of Greece.

Its head office is in Building 221 on the former United States Air Force base in Ellinikon, Elliniko–Argyroupoli. It also has an office in Office 1311, Building 11 on the property of Athens International Airport in Spata. The Ministry of Infrastructure, Transport and Networks oversees the agency.

See also

 Helios Airways Flight 522
 Malév Flight 262

References

External links
 Air Accident Investigation and Aviation Safety Board
 Air Accident Investigation and Aviation Safety Board 

Government agencies of Greece
Aviation organizations based in Greece
Greece
Elliniko-Argyroupoli